Matisse is a Mexican pop band consisting of Pablo Preciado (born April 11, 1988, in Hermosillo, Sonora), Román Torres (born July 2, 1987, in Mexicali, Baja California), and Melissa Robles (born December 21, 1989, in Mexicali, Baja California).

Biography

Formation 
Pablo and Román first met when they were studying music together in Guadalajara. When they moved to Mexico City, they became friends and started writing songs together. Pablo presented some of these songs to Paul Forat, vice president of Sony Music México, who circulated them, leading to artists like Carlos Rivera, Alejandra Guzmán and Cristian Castro recording some of them. It was then that Pablo introduced Román, co-author of some of the songs, to Paul, and from then on they began to work together.

The name Matisse was chosen after Pablo and Román saw a painting by Henri Matisse in Leonel García's recording studio. Later, Melissa joined the group. She had become famous when she uploaded to YouTube a video of her singing “Fascinación” by Carlos Rivera, who helped her sign with Sony.

2014-2016: Sube 
Matisse released their first single, called "La misma luna", in August 2014. That same year, they were featured in the song "Sé que te vas" by the American duo Ha*Ash.

In 2015, Matisse released their debut album Sube, which included a new version of "La Misma Luna". Later that year, they were nominated as "Artista Revelación" (Breakthrough Artist) in the Latin Grammy Awards. In 2016, they were invited to sing at the Palacio de los Deportes during Ha*Ash's concert.

2017-present: Por tu bien 
In 2017, Matisse released their second album, entitled Por tu bien. Before releasing the album, they released a single, called "Todavía", along with a music video. That year, they sang at Sony Music México's event UpFront, along with Ha*Ash and Carlos Rivera.

In 2018, they released another single, Acuérdate de mí, and the titular song from Por tu bien as their third single. That same year, they opened for Mexican band Reik's concerts in the United States and shared the stage with them during some events in Mexico. On April 9, 2019, Matisse released their single "Eres tú", featuring Reik. In the middle of the year, they released their urban rhythm single "Primer avión", featuring Colombian singer Camilo.

Members 

 Román Torres was born July 2, 1987, in Mexicali, Baja California. He is a singer and guitarist.
 Pablo Preciado was born April 11, 1988, in Hermosillo, Sonora. He is a singer and plays the guitar and piano.
 Melissa Robles was born December 21, 1989, in Mexicali, Baja California. She studied marketing before becoming a singer. She also plays the ukulele.

Discography 

 Studio albums

 2015: Sube
 2017: Por tu bien
 2020: Tres

References

External links 
  
 

Musical groups established in 2014
Mexican musical trios
Mexican pop music groups
2014 establishments in Mexico
Latin Grammy Award winners